Leeds Modern School was a school in Leeds, West Yorkshire, England.

History
Leeds Modern School was founded on 14 July 1845 in Rossington Street as the Mathematical and Commercial School. This building in the centre of Leeds became council offices after the school moved to a site at Lawnswood in 1931.

During the 1960s, pupils over 16 years of age were allowed to travel to school on motor-cycles and scooters and, with special permission, by car.

The School merged with the girls' grammar school, Lawnswood High School for Girls in 1972 to form the present Lawnswood School. In 1973 the now Lawnswood School became a comprehensive. The school buildings were demolished by Leeds City Council, and replaced with modern buildings in 2003.

School site
The school site was shared with a separate but identical sister school, Lawnswood High School for Girls. Boys attended Leeds Modern, Girls, Lawnswood High. The schools were separated by a joint school's swimming pool and separate dining hall building. Mixing of boys and girls was strictly prohibited.

The school buildings were mainly red brick with stone features and large windows, with internal corridors of brickwork walls and oak parquet flooring. The main hall had a stage at one end, used for assembly, and was lined with scholarship boards. Classrooms accommodated about 32 pupils.

School facilities included about 20 permanent classrooms, chemistry, physics and biology laboratories, lecture rooms, library, gymnasium, and rooms for metal and woodworking, art and music.

Notable former pupils

Bernard Atha CBE, Lord Mayor of Leeds and major figure in arts and sport
 Author and playwright Alan Bennett
 Prof David Blackbourn, Professor of German and European History at Harvard University and Vanderbilt University
 Robert Blackburn, founder of Blackburn Aircraft
 Wing Commander Sir Eric Bullus, Conservative MP from 1950-74 for Wembley North 
 TV presenter and journalist John Craven
 Henry Drysdale Dakin, biochemist, known for Dakin oxidation and the Dakin–West reaction
 Martin Kettle, journalist
 James Milner, 1st Baron Milner of Leeds, Labour MP from 1929-51 for Leeds South East
 Bob Peck, actor
 Peter Ridsdale, former chairman of Leeds United.
 Prof Wallace Robson, Masson Professor of English Literature from 1972–90 at the University of Edinburgh
 Allan Schiller B.E.M Concert pianist
Guy Schofield, Editor from 1950-55 of the Daily Mail 
 Sir Douglas Smith KCB, Chairman of Acas from 1987–92
 Stanley Tiffany CBE, Labour MP from 1945-50 for Peterborough, and Leader of Wakefield Borough Council from 1952–67
 Herbert Hall Turner, astronomer and Savilian Professor of Astronomy from 1893–1930 at the University of Oxford 
 Brian Woledge, Fielden Professor of French from 1939–71 at University College London

Notable teachers
 John Gunnell taught at the school from 1959 to 1962. He was the leader of West Yorkshire County Council from 1981 to 1986, and Labour MP for Morley and Leeds South from 1992 to 1997, and Morley and Rothwell from 1997 to 2001.
 Robert Shaw (poet), was  head of English, 1964–1968. In addition to his teaching at Leeds Modern, during those years, he was also visiting fellow in English and education at the University of York and  part-time tutor in twentieth-century English literature at the University of Leeds. He  later lectured at the University of Southampton from 1968 to 1972, resigning to become a full-time poet, critic (including TV and radio) and jazz saxophonist – he was a pioneer of poetry and jazz fusion.

References

External links 
 History of Leeds Modern School
 Lawnswood School website

Defunct grammar schools in England
Defunct schools in Leeds
Educational institutions established in 1845
Educational institutions disestablished in 1972
1845 establishments in England
1972 disestablishments in England